The Belconnen Arts Centre is an arts facility in the Australian capital, Canberra was opened in 2009. The facility is owned by the ACT government and managed by Belconnen Arts Center Incorporated. The centre is operated by a small group of staff with support from volunteers.

Architecture 

The Belconnen Arts Centre was designed by Williams Ross Architects and built by Project Coordination Australia P/L. The building is located on the waterfront of Lake Gininderra next to the central business district of Belconnen.

From 2019, the Belconnen Art Center will be expanded in double size with new performance space, dance studios, cafes, conference rooms, and an updated foreshore. The ACT government will invest $15 million over three years to enlarge the space of Belconnen Art Center. In addition, the ACT government has appointed Canberra based company, PBS Building, to be in charge of the construction of phase two. Work on-site begun in December 2018, with the new wing including a 400-seat black box theatre and an additional exhibition space officially opened to the public in August 2020.

Development of dance classes
Grassroots communities were initially chosen to start dance for Parkinson's classes in Australia in order to share information and demonstrate classes with support groups and dance teachers of Parkinson's. In May 2013, Australian teacher training workshops were offered in Sydney and at Queensland Ballet in Brisbane. As the initial training went well, these programs have developed in Brisbane (with Queensland Ballet) and Canberra (at the Belconnen Arts Centre). Each class is full of different artistic and community elements.

Parkinson's ACT collaborates with the Belconnen Art Center to hold dance classes for Parkinson's which were taught by experienced dance teachers and Community Cultural Inclusion Officer Philip Piggin. In July 2013, the ACT Government's Inclusive Participation Funding Program (IPFP) funded the program by supporting the of start dance classes. Participants also have attended activities in other art centres. IMB Foundation has sustained this program by continuously funding the further programs which also expands the classes at the Tuggeranong Arts Centre.

Board Members

Phil Nizette 
As a chairman of the Belconnen Arts Centre, Philip Nizette plays an important role in the artistic and cultural development of Belconnen. He is a public artist, landscape architect, community development worker, public art consultant and sculptor. In 1992, he became a community art worker in the area and a member of Belconnen's cultural program helping to organize several Belconnen festivals. In addition, he is also a former member and Chairman of Strathnairn Arts helping to plan various community art activities and development projects in Belconnen and the Town Centre.

Govert Mellink 
Mellink works as deputy chair at the Belconnen Arts Centre. He has worked for non-profit institutions and public places on three continents which such as Asia, Australia, and Europe for over 20 years, including institutions of education, local, federal and state governments, and other representative bodies. Currently, he works as Director for People and Organisation Consulting at PwC.

See also
List of museums in the Australian Capital Territory

References 

 
Museums in Canberra
Art museums and galleries in Australia